"Je ne veux pas" (meaning "I Don't Want To") is a single by Canadian singer Celine Dion, released in France in mid-1987. The song was written and produced by Romano Musumarra who later worked with Dion on her 1991 album Dion chante Plamondon.

Background
The 7" B-side contained an unreleased track "Comment t'aimer," also produced by Musumarra, and the 12" included extended and extended instrumental version.

The back sleeve of the 12" indicates "Comment t'aimer" (5:27) as the B-side; however, it is an extended instrumental for the same running time which is engraved in the record.

There was no follow-up album. The single was included on Dion's next year compilation The Best of Celine Dion.

"Je ne veux pas" was never released in Canada.

Track listings and formats
French 7" single
"Je ne veux pas" – 3:50
"Comment t'aimer" – 3:58

French 12" maxi-single
"Je ne veux pas" (Extended) – 6:37
"Je ne veux pas" (Extended Instrumental) – 5:27

References

1987 singles
1987 songs
Celine Dion songs
French-language songs
Songs written by Eddy Marnay
Songs written by Romano Musumarra